The Săvăstreni, also known as Recea, is a left tributary of the river Olt in Romania. It discharges into the Olt in Beclean. The upper reach of the river is known as Dejani.

References

Rivers of Romania
Rivers of Brașov County